Maria-Elpida (Elina) Konstantopoulou (born 11 November 1970) is a Greek singer. She represented Greece in the Eurovision Song Contest 1995.

Biography
Konstantopoulou was born in Athens and studied music and singing in the National Conservatory of Athens. Right after that she started to work as a professional singer at night clubs.

In 1993, she was introduced to Nikos Terzis, who was at the time a young and fresh yet successful composer. They started to work together and Nikos composed three songs for her. She immediately signed for a music contract and her first album was out to the stores in 1994. Though a rookie, Elina had the summer hit of Greece in that year. Her song "Otan to tilefono htipisei" (When the phone rings) was a success.

In 1995, she and Terzis co operated once more. This time they tried and eventually succeeded in representing Greece in the Eurovision Song Contest (ESC). The song's title was "Pia Prosefhi" (What kind of prayer) and the video clip was shot in Meteora and was directed by Dafne Tzaferi. The song had a Greek sound and Elina was quite popular during the preparations of the final night in Dublin. She gave a good performance on stage but she did not make it to the top ten. She was awarded 68 points (her top scores included 12pts from Cyprus and 10pts from Israel) and she was 12th out of 23 participants. In the summer of 1995, she had her second album – the music to all 12 tracks was composed by Terzis.

She continued to sing and record albums throughout the 1990s and in 1997 she had a guest appearance in the Greek series Dio Xenoi and in 1999 she got married. Two years later she had a new single and in 2002 she once again tried to represent Greece in the ESC. This time she wasn't alone on stage. She was accompanied by the young Cypriot singer Marion Georgiou. Their song "Beautiful Life" was among the ten finalists, but it didn't make it to the first five and didn't compete to the final round.

Her relationship with the Eurovision Song Contest didn't stop there. In 2005, she replaced Elena Patroklou and she accompanied Constantinos Christoforou on stage in Kyiv. Dressed in white she was once more fresh and exotic, but the Cypriot entry was a flop and ranked 18th. In 2010, she released an album under the title Xekina, which contains Greek covers of songs of Thalía and Cristian Castro.

On 1 March 2012, Elina releases her new Digital Single called "Mia Anamnisi" (One Memory) under the label of qooackmusic (a new Internet discography company) . The song is the first out of four new songs that are going to be released during 2012. Composer of the song is Dim_Aros and lyricist Yorgos Bitounis.

Discography

References
 
  

1970 births
Living people
Eurovision Song Contest entrants of 1995
Eurovision Song Contest entrants for Greece
20th-century Greek women singers
Greek laïko singers
Singers from Athens
21st-century Greek women singers